Brian L Curtis is a male former swimmer who competed for England.

Swimming career
He represented England in the 220 yards butterfly at the 1958 British Empire and Commonwealth Games in Cardiff, Wales.

He was a member of the Watford Swimming Club.

References

Swimmers at the 1958 British Empire and Commonwealth Games
Commonwealth Games competitors for England
English male swimmers